The 2017 California Golden Bears football team represented the University of California, Berkeley in the 2017 NCAA Division I FBS football season. The Bears were led by first-year head coach Justin Wilcox and played their home games at California Memorial Stadium. The Bears went 5–7, including non-conference wins over North Carolina and Ole Miss, and three losses by three points or fewer. The season highlight was the Bears' 37–3 defeat of then-No. 8 Washington State, which marked the first time Cal had beaten a top ten opponent since its defeat of No. 3 USC in 2003.

Previous season 

Fourth-year head coach Sonny Dykes led the Golden Bears to a record of 5–7 (3–6 Pac-12) in 2016 to finish in a tie for fourth place in the North Division. On January 8, 2017, Dykes was fired. He finished at Cal with a four-year record of 19–30.

On January 14, 2017, Justin Wilcox was hired as the new head coach for the Golden Bears, following the dismissal of Dykes.

Recruiting

Position key

Recruits

The Golden Bears signed a total of 14 recruits.

Personnel

Coaching staff

Roster

Schedule 

Source:

Game summaries

at North Carolina

Weber State

Ole Miss

USC

at Oregon

at Washington

Washington State 

 The game marked Cal's first win against a top ten opponent since 2003.
 The three points allowed by the Bears defense are the fewest since holding UC Davis to three points in 2010.
 In the fourth quarter, quarterback Ross Bowers executed a flip into the end zone to put the Bears up 27-3.

Arizona

at Colorado

Oregon State 

 The game was the sixth time in program history that Cal had zero punts in a game. It was the first time that Cal had zero punts in a game since playing USC in 2004.
 Matt Anderson broke the Cal record for career scoring, reaching 297 points after kicking three field goals and four extra points in the game. He broke the previous record of 288 points held by Doug Brien since 1993. Anderson would finish the season with an all-time record of 316 points.
 Patrick Laird's 214 yards rushing ranks tenth in program history for rushing yards in a single game.

at Stanford

at UCLA 

 Matt Anderson broke the Cal record for career field goals, reaching 60 after kicking four field goals in the game. He broke the previous record of 56 field goals held by Doug Brien since 1993.
 Ross Bowers reached 3,000 passing yards for the season and became the seventh player in Cal history to reach the milestone.
 Patrick Laird reached 1,000 rushing yards for the season and became the sixteenth player in Cal history to reach the milestone.

Awards and honors

Coaches
Tim DeRuyter (Defensive Coordinator)
Athlon Sports' National Defensive Coordinator of the Week, vs. Washington State

Offense
Ross Bowers (QB)
Manning Award Stars of the Week, vs. North Carolina
Patrick Laird (RB)
Burlsworth Trophy semifinalist
First-team Pac-12 All-Academic
All-Pac-12 Honorable Mention
CoSIDA Academic All-District Team
Malik McMorris (FB)
SB Nation Piesman Trophy finalist
Kanawai Noa (WR)
Polynesian College Football Player of the Year Award watchlist
Vic Wharton III (WR)
Biletnikoff Award watchlist
Jake Curhan (OL)
Second-team Pac-12 All-Academic
Patrick Mekari (OL)
All-Pac-12 Honorable Mention
Tony Mekari (G)
Second-team Pac-12 All-Academic

Defense
James Looney (DL)
All-Pac-12 Honorable Mention
Devante Downs (LB)
Chuck Bednarik Award watchlist
Lott IMPACT Trophy watchlist
All-Pac-12 Honorable Mention
Pac-12 Defensive Player of the Week, at North Carolina
Pac-12 Defensive Player of the Week(2), vs. Ole Miss
College Sports Madness National Defensive Player of the Week, vs. Ole Miss
College Sports Madness Pac-12 Defensive Player of the Week, vs. Ole Miss
Jordan Kunaszyk (LB)
Pac-12 Defensive Player of the Week, vs. Washington State
Rose Bowl: Pac-12 Defensive Player of the Week, vs. Washington State
Walter Camp National Defensive Player of the Week, vs. Washington State
College Sports Madness Pac-12 Defensive Player of the Week, vs. Washington State
Luke Rubenzer (S)
First-team Pac-12 All-Academic

Special teams
Matt Anderson (PK)
Pac-12 Football Scholar-Athlete of the Year
Campbell Trophy semifinalist 
Lou Groza Award pre-season watchlist
Senior CLASS Award candidate
Second-team Pac-12 All-Academic
CoSIDA Academic All-District Team

References

California
California Golden Bears football seasons
California Golden Bears football